The year 1786 in architecture involved some significant architectural events and new buildings.

Buildings and structures

Buildings completed

Casa de Esteban de Luca, Buenos Aires, Argentina.
Golghar, Patna, India, built by Captain John Garstin.  
Henley Bridge, designed by William Hayward of Shrewsbury, who died before construction was completed.
Schloss Bellevue in Berlin, Germany, designed by Michael Philipp Boumann.
St. Catherine's Cathedral, Kherson, Ukraine, built by General Ivan Gannibal.

Awards
 Grand Prix de Rome, architecture: Charles Percier.

Births
January 23 – Auguste de Montferrand, French Neoclassical architect who worked primarily in Russia (died 1858)
May 7 – John Watts, Irish military architect (died 1873)

Deaths
February 28 – John Gwynn, English architect and civil engineer (born 1713)
October 20 – Humphrey Sturt, British architect (born c.1725)

References

Architecture
Years in architecture
18th-century architecture